Lucielmo Palhano Soares (born 28 September 1988), also known as Lúcio Maranhão, is a Brazilian professional footballer who plays for América de Natal as a forward.

Biography
Lucio born in São Luís, Maranhão, Brazil, and increased local group Maranhão. In 2010 moved to the Department of Youth of media Horizonte debut as an actor in his mature group.

During 2012, Lucio has signed a three-year ASA de Arapiraca and media value of 65 games in which scored 31 goals. During the period it was under contract to ASA de Arapiraca seconded Lucio Vitória groups and Figueirense.

During 2014 it was purchased by a group of Lucio on Buriram United Thai Bdmdih value 7 concerts which scored two goals. In early 2015 he returned to Brazil and signed for the season Fortaleza media value 37 appearances and scored 7 goals. The following season, he signed CRB and beg from media value 35 appearances scored 13 goals in them.

On 17 July 2016 he signed with Hapoel Be'er Sheva Lucio three years. On 30 July, Lucio made his first appearance in a 5–0 victory over Hapoel Ashkelon as part of the Toto Cup, During the game scoring the first goal in the group. On 3 August, Lucio first appeared in the game in the framework the Champions League qualification in front of Olympiacos.  On 11 August won with Hapoel Beer Sheva title of Super Cup after winning the cup holders 4–2 Maccabi Haifa. Later in the season he won the Toto Cup with Be'er Sheva. In January's transfer window, Lúcio was loaned to the F.C. Ashdod until the end of the season.

On 16 July 2017, after being released by, Be'er Sheva, he signed for Elazığspor.

On 23 July 2021, Lúcio signed for Hapoel Tel Aviv.

Honours
Buriram United
 Thai League T1: 2014

Figueirense
Campeonato Catarinense: 2014

Fortaleza
Campeonato Cearense: 2015

CRB
Campeonato Alagoano: 2016

Hapoel Beer Sheva
Toto Cup: 2016–17
Israel Super Cup: 2016

References

External links
 
 

1988 births
Living people
Association football forwards
Brazilian footballers
People from São Luís, Maranhão
Maranhão Atlético Clube players
Agremiação Sportiva Arapiraquense players
Esporte Clube Vitória players
Figueirense FC players
Lucio Maranhao
Hapoel Be'er Sheva F.C. players
F.C. Ashdod players
Horizonte Futebol Clube players
Elazığspor footballers
Hapoel Hadera F.C. players
Hapoel Ironi Kiryat Shmona F.C. players
Hapoel Tel Aviv F.C. players
Bnei Yehuda Tel Aviv F.C. players
América Futebol Clube (RN) players
Campeonato Brasileiro Série A players
Campeonato Brasileiro Série B players
Lucio Maranhao
Israeli Premier League players
Liga Leumit players
Expatriate footballers in Thailand
Expatriate footballers in Israel
Expatriate footballers in Turkey
Brazilian expatriate sportspeople in Thailand
Brazilian expatriate sportspeople in Israel
Brazilian expatriate sportspeople in Turkey
Sportspeople from Maranhão